Peter Hamilton may refer to:

Writers
 Peter F. Hamilton (born 1960), English science-fiction writer
 Peter Hamilton (editor), Scottish editor of Nebula Science Fiction

Sportspeople
 Peter Hamilton (footballer born 1931) (1931–1981), Australian rules footballer for North Melbourne
 Peter Hamilton (footballer born 1956) (1956-2019), Australian rules footballer for Melbourne
 Pete Hamilton (1942–2017), American race car driver

Others
 Peter Hunter Hamilton (1800–1857), one of the founding fathers of Hamilton, Ontario
 Peter J. Hamilton (1859–1927), Alabama lawyer/historian and Puerto Rico federal judge
 Peter Hamilton, captain of Air Canada Flight 621
 Peter Hamilton (diplomat), New Zealand diplomat, see List of Ambassadors and High Commissioners to and from New Zealand
 William Peter Hamilton (1867–1929), Wall Street Journal editor